Heart of Gold Records is an American independent record label, established in Florence, Alabama.

Artists who have released material on Heart of Gold include The Heart of Gold Band, Donna Jean Godchaux-Mackay, BoomBox, and Fiddleworms.

Heart of Gold Records is active in the Muscle Shoals, Alabama music and arts community.

See also
 List of record labels

References

External links
Heart of Gold Records Official Site
Heart of Gold Band's official site

American independent record labels
Rock record labels
Indie rock record labels
Alternative rock record labels